On the Impossible Past is the third studio album by American punk rock band The Menzingers. It was released by Epitaph Records on February 21, 2012. The album was met with widespread acclaim by music critics, with the aggregating website Metacritic calculating an average score of 93 out of 100.

Track listing
All songs written, composed and performed by The Menzingers

On the Possible Past
Pre-orders of the album included a cassette titled On the Possible Past, which contains demos recorded during the winter and spring of 2011. The collection was released on a one time pressing of 1,000 on green vinyl by Epitaph Records.

 "Good Things" – 2:18
 "Burn" – 2:15
 "Ava" – 2:46
 "Sun Hotel" – 3:51
 "Sculptors and Vandals" – 2:22
 "Casey" – 3:18
 "I Can't Seem to Tell" – 2:33
 "Freedom Bridge" – 2:38

Reception

Critical response

On the Impossible Past garnered critical acclaim upon its release. At Metacritic, which assigns a normalized rating out of 100 to reviews from mainstream music critics, the album received an average score of 93, based on nine reviews, which indicates "universal acclaim". AllMusic writer Gregory Heaney awarded the album four stars out of five and praised its "wryly nostalgic performance, giving a nod to their punk roots as they embrace the rugged earnestness of the Rust Belt with songs about broken hearts, loneliness, and self-doubt." Thomas Nassiff of AbsolutePunk called the album "sweeping, driven, masterful" as he scored it a near-perfect 9.5/10. He confessed that despite "review[ing] albums every week, I just can't seem to fully explain my adoration" for it, before summarizing On the Impossible Past "is an album that should have come out decades ago...this is something that has no expiration date." Steve Lepore of PopMatters called the album "an impeccably crafted melodic hardcore record by a group ready for its close-up." The album also received favorable reviews from the BBC and Exclaim!

Accolades

Personnel
The Menzingers
Tom May – guitar, vocals
Joe Godino – drums
Greg Barnett – guitar, vocals
Eric Keen - bass guitar

References

2012 albums
Epitaph Records albums
The Menzingers albums
Albums produced by Matt Allison (record producer)
Melodic hardcore albums